George Distel is an American politician who served in the Ohio House of Representatives, representing the 99th district, from 1999 to 2008 and as executive director of the Ohio Turnpike Commission from 2008 to 2011. 

21st-century American politicians
Living people
Democratic Party members of the Ohio House of Representatives
1952 births